is a railway station on the Sasaguri Line operated by JR Kyushu in Kasuya, Kasuya District, Fukuoka Prefecture, Japan.

Lines
The station is sometimes depicted on maps and timetables as part of the Fukuhoku Yutaka Line, of which the Sasaguri Line is a component.

Station layout 
The station consists of two side platforms serving two tracks. The station shares a building with a community facility named "Harmony Hall Harumachi". There is a small waiting area and a staffed ticket window. Access to the opposite side platform is by means of a covered footbridge.

Management of the station has been outsourced to the JR Kyushu Tetsudou Eigyou Co., a wholly owned subsidiary of JR Kyushu specialising in station services. It staffs the ticket window which is equipped with a POS machine but without a Midori no Madoguchi facility.

Adjacent stations

History
When the Kyushu Railway was nationalized on 1 July 1907, Japanese Government Railways (JGR) took over control of the station. On 12 October 1909, the station became part of the Sasaguri Line. With the privatization of Japanese National Railways (JNR), the successor of JGR, on 1 April 1987, JR Kyushu took over control of the station.

Passenger statistics
In fiscal 2016, the station was used by an average of 1,407 passengers daily (boarding passengers only), and it ranked 124th among the busiest stations of JR Kyushu.

References

External links
Harumachi (JR Kyushu)

Railway stations in Japan opened in 1904
Railway stations in Fukuoka Prefecture
Stations of Kyushu Railway Company